Mafatih al-Jinan (Keys to Heavens) (Arabic :مفاتیح الجنان)  by Sheikh Abbas Qumi is a Twelver Shi'a compilation of Qur'anic Chapters, Dua's, Taaqeebat&e-Namaz (acts of worship after Namaz), acts during Islamic months and days, supplications narrated from the Ahle bayt and the text of Ziyarats.

Author

The Mafatih al-Jinan was authored by Shaykh Abbas Qummi. He was a Shia scholar, historian, and hadith narrator.

Title and Terminology
The Mafatih al-Jinan is of Arabic origin and means the Keys to Heavens or Keys of paradises. The Mafatih mean the keys and The meaning of Jinan is "Garden, paradise or Heaven".

Popularity
The book is widely popular in the Twelver world and is widely available at Shi'a shrines in much of Iran and Iraq. The book was originally in Persian translation & commentary accompanied with Arabic text but was later  was translated into Urdu, English and Hindi. Now, the book is also available in India and Pakistan with Urdu translation. Its application in also available for Android smartphones.

Mafatih al-hayat

Mafatih al-Hayat, is a religious work written by Abdollah Javadi-Amoli intended to complete Mafatih al-Janan, a book by Sheikh Abbas Qummi.

Differences from Mafatih al-Janan

In Amoli's own words, Mafatih al-Janan focuses on how humans can pursue the right path in the light of God. By contrast, Mafatih al-Hayat discusses the ways a man can interact and communicate with other creatures.

See also

Al-Sahifa al-Sajjadiyya
Kitab al-Kafi
Al-Istibsar
Tahdhib al-Ahkam
Man La Yahduruhu al-Faqih
A`amaal Ummi Dawud

References

External links
 Mafatih al-Jinan [Arabic - English] is Available on the link in several formats:
Mafatih Al-Jinan - Complete Dua's
Dua e Kumayl
Full text at 
3- Arabic-English on the Free Downloadable in Several Formats

Shia literature